The Indianapolis mayoral election of 1947 took place on November 4, 1947 and saw the election of Democrat Al Feeney, who defeated Republican William Wemmer. Democrats swept city offices in the coinciding elections. Ahead of the election, a high level of Democratic voter registration caused it to be anticipated that Fenney would have a strong chance of winning.

Results

References

1947
1947 United States mayoral elections
1947 Indiana elections